Crossaster is a genus of sea stars in the family Solasteridae.

Species
The following species are listed in the World Register of Marine Species:
 Crossaster borealis Fisher, 1906
 Crossaster campbellicus McKnight, 1973
 Crossaster diamesus (Djakonov, 1932)
 Crossaster helianthus Verrill, 1894
 Crossaster japonicus (Fisher, 1911)
 Crossaster multispinus H.L. Clark, 1916
 Crossaster papposus (Linnaeus, 1767)
 Crossaster penicillatus Sladen, 1889
 Crossaster scotophilus (Fisher, 1913)
 Crossaster squamatus (Döderlein, 1900)

References

Solasteridae
Asteroidea genera